The Kennedy colonial by-election, 1869 was a by-election held on 10 July 1869 in the electoral district of Kennedy for the Queensland Legislative Assembly.

History
On 11 June 1869, Thomas Henry FitzGerald, member for Kennedy, resigned. Rt Hon John Bright, an English Radical politician, was nominated as a form of protest, and won the resulting by-election on 10 July 1869. He never took his seat in the Queensland Parliament; indeed it is unknown if he knew he was either nominated or elected.

See also
 Members of the Queensland Legislative Assembly, 1868–1870

References

1869 elections in Australia
Queensland state by-elections
1860s in Queensland